Cherry House may refer to:

Cherry House (North Little Rock, Arkansas), listed on the National Register of Historic Places (NRHP)
Cherry-Luter Estate, North Little Rock, Arkansas, NRHP-listed
Cherry Hall, Bowling Green, Kentucky, NRHP-listed
Cherry Hotel, Wilson, North Carolina, NRHP-listed
Peter L. Cherry House, Astoria, Oregon, NRHP-listed
Cherry Mansion, Savannah, Tennessee, NRHP-listed

See also
Cherry Hill (disambiguation)